Dashtak-e Meymand (also known as Dashtak-e Bālā and Dashtak-e ‘Olyā) is a village in Sadat Mahmudi Rural District, Pataveh District, Dana County, Kohgiluyeh and Boyer-Ahmad Province, Iran. At the 2006 census, its population was 295, in 67 families.

References 

Populated places in Dana County